Ahmed Mesilhy (born 25 November 1994) is an Egyptian handball player. He competed in the 2020 Summer Olympics.

References

1994 births
Living people
Sportspeople from Giza
Handball players at the 2020 Summer Olympics
Egyptian male handball players
Olympic handball players of Egypt
Competitors at the 2022 Mediterranean Games
Mediterranean Games silver medalists for Egypt
Mediterranean Games medalists in handball
21st-century Egyptian people